SS Haiti was a passenger and freight ship built for the Colombian Mail Steamship Company built at Newport News Shipbuilding, Newport News, Virginia and delivered 15 December 1932. The ship was renamed briefly Puerto Rico in 1938 and Monterey in 1939 to operate for the New York and Cuba Mail Steamship Company until requisitioned with transfer of title to the War Shipping Administration (WSA) on 25 September 1942. The ship was then allocated to the U.S. Army for operation under a bareboat agreement as USAT Monterey. In 1943 the ship was assigned to the command at Trinidad to supply bases in Brazil and Ascension Island. After layup in the reserve fleet the ship was sold to Turkey.

Construction and design
Haiti's keel was laid 4 April 1932 at Newport News Shipbuilding with launch on 17 September and delivery on 15 December, less than a month after delivery of her sister ship  on 17 November 1932. The ships were designed by Theodore E. Ferris, the noted naval architect and marine engineer for the Emergency Fleet Corporation/United States Shipping Board responsible for that organization's designs. Construction of both Haiti and Colombia was financed by the United States Shipping Board's Bureau of Construction and Finance with a loan of $1,687,500 for each ship with the total cost of Haiti being $2,343,162.07.

Cargo and engineering
Propulsion was by three in series Newport News impulse turbines delivering up to a continuous 7,500 shaft horsepower through reduction gears to a single screw of  diameter. Electricity for extensive use throughout the ship, including deck windlass, capstans, winches and watertight doors was supplied by three 250 kilowatt General Electric generator sets which also charged a storage battery bank for emergency power in case of main plant failure. Six cargo holds were served by cargo side ports for No. 3 and No. 4 with hatches for the balance with each of the two masts having four 5 ton booms and the foremast an additional 25 ton boom.

Passenger accommodations
Capacity was for 134 first and 24 tourist class passengers with first class spaces done in a "modern Spanish" motif with first class accommodations having twin beds and designed to meet hotel standards of the time. All had telephones and most were outside rooms with sliding glass windows or ports. A swimming pool was located on the bridge deck partially open and partially inside a verandah.

Service history

Commercial 1932–1942
Haiti and sister ship Colombia provided scheduled commercial service on a route from New York to Port-au-Prince, Haiti, Kingston, Jamaica, Puerto Colombia and Cartagena, Colombia and Cristobal, Panama. After the ship's 1938–1939 transfer to the New York & Cuba Mail Steamship Company's Cuba Mail Line
and renaming to Puerto Rico and then Monterey service included New York, Havana, Cuba and Vera Cruz, Mexico.

War Shipping Administration
Monterey was delivered by the New York & Cuba Mail Steamship Company to the War Shipping Administration on 14 February 1942 under a bareboat charter and operated by Atlantic, Gulf & West Indies Lines (AGWI Lines) acting as agent for WSA to meet Army transport requirements. On 6 August 1942 the ship was allocated to Navy under a sub-bareboat charter for "Repairing" while Navy was acquiring a group of commercial type vessels to modify into combat loaders for the North African campaign. Title to the ship delivered to WSA on 25 September. Conversion of the ship to Navy requirements as prospective Alameda (AP-68) was cancelled when Navy found the ship unsuitable for the mission. Other possibilities were explored, including conversion to a combined operations flagship, but those were abandoned and Monterey returned to Army support. On 16 January the ship was delivered to the War Department for Army operation as USAT Monterey.

Army operations in the West Indies and South Atlantic had been hampered by port congestion and transportation problems at the base in Trinidad into the spring of 1943 when a new 1,202-foot Army wharf, port and railway equipment improved operations. Along with the improvements the Transportation Corps command at Trinidad was assigned the USAT Monterey for direct support of Trinidad and bases in the West Indies, at Ascension Island and in Brazil.

Turkish service
The ship was renamed Cankiri and then Adana after sale.

Footnotes

References

References cited

External links
 "New Steamers; Columbian Steamship Company Article pages 49–50 detailing design, features and motif of Columbia and Haiti with photographs.
 Colombia and Haiti "Spanish Main cruise brochure image

1932 ships
Ships built in Newport News, Virginia
Passenger ships of the United States
Troop ships of the United States
Transport ships of the United States Army